Fitting's theorem is a mathematical theorem proved by Hans Fitting. It can be stated as follows:

If M and N are nilpotent normal subgroups of a group G, then their product MN is also a nilpotent normal subgroup of G; if, moreover, M is nilpotent of class m and N is nilpotent of class n, then MN is nilpotent of class at most m + n.

By induction it follows also that the subgroup generated by a finite collection of nilpotent normal subgroups is nilpotent. This can be used to show that the Fitting subgroup of certain types of groups (including all finite groups) is nilpotent. However, a subgroup generated by an infinite collection of nilpotent normal subgroups need not be nilpotent.

Order-theoretic statement
In terms of order theory, (part of) Fitting's theorem can be stated as:
The set of nilpotent normal subgroups form a lattice of subgroups.
Thus the nilpotent normal subgroups of a finite group also form a bounded lattice, and have a top element, the Fitting subgroup.

However, nilpotent normal subgroups do not in general form a complete lattice, as a subgroup generated by an infinite collection of nilpotent normal subgroups need not be nilpotent, though it will be normal. The join of all nilpotent normal subgroups is still defined as the Fitting subgroup, but it need not be nilpotent.

External links 

Theorems in group theory